Asset Orentaiuly Issekeshev (Äset Örentaiūly İsekeşev; born 17 August 1971) is Kazakh politician who is serving as an aide to the President of Kazakhstan and the Secretary of the Security Council since January 2020. Previously, he served as the executive director of the Fund of the First President of Kazakhstan from March 2019 to January 2020, head of the Presidential Administration from September 2018 to March 2019, äkim of Nur-Sultan from June 2016 to September 2018, Deputy Prime Minister and Minister of Industry and New Technologies from March 2010 to August 2014, and Minister of Investments and Development from August 2014 to June 2016.

Biography

Early life and education 
Asset Issekeshev was born in 1971 in Karaganda. In 1994, he graduated from the Al-Farabi Kazakh National University with a degree in law and later graduated from the Higher School of Public Administration in 1998.

Career 
In 1989, he was a fitter-assembler of radio equipment at the Omega Ural plant. From 1995 to 1997, he worked as the Assistant and Senior Assistant Attorney in Medeu district of southeastern Almaty. In 1998, he became a chief specialist of the Agency for Strategic Planning and Reforms of the Republic of Kazakhstan.

From 1999 to 2000, he worked as director of the Department for Registration and Control over normative legal acts of central and local bodies of the Ministry of Justice. In 2000, Issekeshev became the President of ZAO National Legal Service. From 2001 to 2002, he served as the First Deputy Chairman of APK Sunkar LLP, President of National Consulting Group LLP, Vice President for Corporate Development and Legal Issues, First Vice President of Ordabasy Corporation OJSC.

In November 2002, Issekeshev became an advisor to the Minister of Economy and Budget Planning Kairat Kelimbetov. In June 2003, he became Vice Minister of Industry and Trade.

From May 2006, Issekeshev served as deputy chairman of the Board of Kazyna Sustainable Development Fund JSC. From 2007 to 2008, he was the marketing director of Financial Projects LLP Credit Swiss Kazakhstan.

In February 2008, he was appointed as the assistant to the President of Kazakhstan and served that position until becoming the Minister of Industry and Trade on 21 May 2009. On 12 March 2010, Issekeshev was appointed as the Deputy Prime Minister of Kazakhstan and Minister of Industry and New Technologies in Massimov's cabinet. He was reappointed after the Ministry was reorganized on 6 August 2014 as Minister of Investment and Development.

On 21 June 2016, Issekeshev became the äkim of Astana. Under his leadership, Issekeshev earned nickname by the residents of Astana as "most people's akim" due to his feedback on social networks, in particular on Facebook. Issekeshev was seen replying to residents on the social media at 2am. Due to the large number of requests to the äkim, a joke "tag Issekeshev" even appeared in the Kazakhstan's social media. Issekeshev also warned residents and guests of the city on his pages about the upcoming precipitation and cheered up Astana residents with news about good weather.

From 10 September 2018 to 24 March 2019, Issekeshev was the head of the Presidential Administration of Kazakhstan, replacing the retired Adilbek Zhaksybekov. On 25 March 2019, he became the executive director of the Fund of the First President and since 16 January 2020, Issekeshev has been serving as the secretary of the Security Council.

References

External links 
Кадровые назначения 
Кадровые перестановки 

1971 births
Living people
People from Karaganda Region
Ministers of Industry (Kazakhstan)
Ministers of Trade (Kazakhstan)
Government ministers of Kazakhstan
Deputy Prime Ministers of Kazakhstan